United States gubernatorial elections were held on November 5, 1991, in three states and one territory. Prior to the elections, Democrats held two seats and Republicans held one. The national balance of power did not change as a result of the elections, but the balance of power shifted in two states.

Election results

Closest races 
States where the margin of victory was under 5%:
 Mississippi, 3.2%

Notes

References